Nirmala College may refer to:

 Nirmala College, Muvattupuzha

Nirmala College for Women, in Coimbatore, Tamil Nadu
Nirmala College of Engineering, in Meloor, Kerala
Nirmala College, Ranchi